Ranna an aeir ("The Constellations") is the title of a medieval Irish astronomical tract, thought to date from c.1500–1550? It was written in Early Modern Irish, with some words in English and Latin. 


See also
 An Irish Astronomical Tract

References

Manuscript Sources
 National Library of Scotland; Advocates 72.1.2 olim Gaelic II (The National Library of Ireland holds a microfilm copy (n. 307, p. 452).)

Edition
 A. O. Anderson, Ranna an aeir [The Constellations] in Revue Celtique, Ed. Henri d'Arbois de Jubainville, Volume 30, Paris, F. Vieweg (1909) page 404–417

Astronomy books
Astronomy in Ireland
Irish texts
Irish manuscripts
Irish-language literature
16th century in Ireland
16th-century books
Texts of medieval Ireland